Charles Camilleri (April 3, 1923 – December 23, 2011), was a Canadian football player who played for the Toronto Argonauts. He won the Grey Cup with Toronto in 1946 and 1947. He later worked for CBS Records. In 2013, Camilleri was inducted into the Mississauga Music Walk of Fame.

References

Canadian football people from Toronto
Toronto Argonauts players
Players of Canadian football from Ontario
Canadian football quarterbacks
1923 births
2011 deaths